Brynki may refer to the following places in Poland:

Brynki Rekowskie
Nowe Brynki
Stare Brynki